Advanced Matrix Extensions (AMX), also known as Intel Advanced Matrix Extensions (Intel AMX), are extensions to the x86 instruction set architecture (ISA) for microprocessors from Intel and Advanced Micro Devices (AMD) designed to work on matrices to accelerate artificial intelligence (AI) / machine learning (ML) -related workloads.

Extensions
AMX was introduced by Intel in June 2020 and first supported by Intel with the Sapphire Rapids microarchitecture for Xeon servers, released in January 2023. It introduced 2-dimensional registers called tiles upon which accelerators can perform operations. It is intended as an extensible architecture; the first accelerator implemented is called tile matrix multiply unit (TMUL).

In Intel Architecture Instruction Set Extensions and Future Features revision 46, published in September 2022, a new AMX-FP16 extension was documented, planned for inclusion in the future Granite Rapids processors. This extension adds support for half-precision floating-point numbers.

Tile matrix multiply unit
TMUL unit supports BF16 and INT8 input types. AMX-FP16 also adds support for FP16 numbers. The register file consists of 8 tiles, each with 16 rows of size 64-byte (32 BF16/FP16 or 64 INT8 values). The only supported operation as for now is matrix multiplication

Software support 
 Compiler and assembler support
 LLVM initial support committed at 1 July 2020
 GNU Assembler (GAS) initial support committed at 25 June 2020
 GCC patches have been posted for version 11 and merged
Operating system support
glibc support for detecting AMX feature in CPUs committed at 25 June 2020
Linux kernel support released in version 5.16

References

External links 
 Intel Intrinsics Guide
 Wikichip: Advanced Matrix Extension (AMX) - x86

X86 instructions
SIMD computing
AMD technologies